Metapetrocosmea is a genus of flowering plants belonging to the family Gesneriaceae.

Its native range is Hainan.

Species
Species:
 Metapetrocosmea peltata (Merr. & Chun) W.T.Wang

References

Didymocarpoideae
Gesneriaceae genera